John Edward Jenkins (2 July 1838 – 4 June 1910), known as Edward Jenkins or J. Edward Jenkins, was a barrister, author and Liberal Party politician in the United Kingdom. He was best known as an author of satirical novels, and also served as the Agent-General of Canada, encouraging emigration to the new Dominion. He contested several parliamentary elections, but won only one, and sat in the House of Commons from 1874 to 1880.

Early life 
Jenkins was born in Bangalore, Mysore, India, the eldest son of Rev. Dr. John Jenkins (1813–1898), a minister of the Wesleyan Methodist Missionary Society from 1837 to 1841. His father moved to Canada in 1847 as a Methodist minister, before becoming a Presbyterian minister in Philadelphia in 1853, and minister of a Presbyterian Church in Montreal, Quebec, Canada, from 1865. His mother was Harriet Shepstone of Mysore.

Edward's uncles included David James Jenkins, the MP for Penryn and Falmouth, and Rev. Ebenezer Jenkins, the chairman of Wesleyan Indian Missions.

He was educated in Montreal at the High School and at McGill University, and then at the University of Pennsylvania. He then moved to London, where he studied law with a conveyancer, Mr. Raymond, and was called to the bar at Lincoln's Inn in the Michaelmas term, 1864. He practised as a barrister on the Home Circuit.

Career 
Jenkins made his name as the author of the satire Ginx's Baby: his birth and other misfortunes, published in 1870. The book described a child born in poverty who became the victim of rival philanthropists.

He wrote at least two other satires, Lord Bantam (1871) and Barney Geoghegan, M.P (1872). The review of Lord Bantam in The Times newspaper in 1872 describes a political novel telling the story of a young nobleman of radical politics who enters Parliament supporting a redistribution of land and power, but who promptly abandons his radicalism when he inherits his father's peerage and large estates. The reviewer denounces the book as a vehicle for "Red Republican opinions", and remarks that the author wants the reader to conclude that "the working classes need never expect to derive any permanent advancement from the Radical professions of young lords who have such a stake in the existing institutions of the country". Jenkins supported the campaigns of the Warwickshire agricultural trade unionist Joseph Arch, and his novel Little Hodge (1873) dealt with the plight of landless labourers in England.

As well as the satires, Jenkins wrote a series of novels and many non-fiction-works, most of them relating to Canada.

He travelled in 1870 to Guiana on behalf of the English Benevolent Society, to "report of the condition of the coolies" (i.e. indentured labourers). His report was published in 1871, and resulted in the improvement of their conditions.

Jenkins stood for Parliament at two by-elections in the 1870s: Truro in September 1871, and Dundee in August 1873.

He was elected a member of parliament (MP) for Dundee at the 1874 general election The city was such a Liberal stronghold that its two seats were contested by four Liberals and one Conservative, and the lone Conservative came last of the five candidates. Jenkins won the seat despite being in America during the election
in February, while on a lecture tour in Canada, he was appointed as the agent-general of the Dominion of Canada. His duties in that role were clarified to the House of Commons of Canada in May 1874 by the Canadian Prime Minister Alexander Mackenzie, who said that Jenkins would have surveillance of the Canadian emigration business in London, would occasionally be asked to attend to other business of a confidential nature. He would also be "expected to give some little attention to Canadian gentlemen sojourning in London". He held the post for two years.

On his return to Dundee in March, he addressed a meeting of electors in the Kinnaird Hall, Dundee. Between 2,000 and 3,000 people attended, with hundreds turned away because the hall was full.

Jenkins did not contest the 1880 general election, but stood unsuccessfully at a by-election in January 1881 for Edinburgh. He contested Dundee again at the 1885 and 1892 general elections as a Conservative, but was unsuccessful on both occasions.

He died in London on 4 June 1910, having been paralysed for some years.

Family 
Like his father, Jenkins was a Presbyterian.

In 1867 he married Hannah Matilda Johnstone, a daughter of William Johnson, of Belfast. They had five sons and two daughters.

Works

Fiction

Non-fiction

References

External links 
 
 
 

 
 

1838 births
1910 deaths
Scottish Liberal Party MPs
UK MPs 1874–1880
Members of Lincoln's Inn
Scottish Presbyterians
British satirists
McGill University alumni
University of Pennsylvania alumni
British non-fiction writers
British male writers
Members of the Parliament of the United Kingdom for Dundee constituencies
Conservative Party (UK) parliamentary candidates
Male non-fiction writers